Aligarh (formerly known as Allygarh, and Kol) is a city in the state of Uttar Pradesh in India. The districts which adjoin Aligarh are Gautam Buddha Nagar, Bulandshahr, Sambhal, Badaun, Kasganj, Hathras, Etah and Mathura. As of 2011, Aligarh is the 53rd most populous city in India.

The recorded history of Aligarh begins with the establishment of the Aligarh Fort in the 16th century. It is a university town, notable as the seat of Aligarh Muslim University, which was founded here as Muhammadan Anglo-Oriental College in 1875, initiating the Aligarh Movement.

History
Written references to the city commence only from 12th century onward; however, archeological records suggest that the town used to be inhabited by Jains. The area of Aligarh before the Ghurid conquest of the region, was under the sway of Dor Rajputs in twelfth century.

In 1194, Qutb-ud-din Aibak had mounted a successful invasion of the region and Hisam-ud-din Ulbak was installed as the first Muslim governor; court-historian Hasan Nizami noted Kol to be "one of the most celebrated fortresses of Hind". Beginning the 13th century, the place featured — as Kol or Koil — in multiple Persian (as well as non-Persian) Sultanate sources as a center of economic prominence esp. for production of distilled wine. By the mid-13th century, the town commanded enough importance for (would-be Sultan) Ghiyas ud din Balban to erect a minaret.

Under the Khiljis and Tughlaqs, the prominence continued unabated; it had become an iqta by the times of Alauddin Khalji.

Kol is mentioned in Ibn Battuta's Rihla, when Ibn Battuta, along with 15 ambassadors representing Ukhaantu Khan, emperor of the Mongol Chinese Yuan dynasty, travelled to Kol city en route to the coast at Cambay (in Gujarat) in 1341. According to Battuta, it would appear that the district was then in a very disturbed state since the escort of the Emperor's embassy had to assist in relieving Jalali from an attacking body of Hindus and lost an officer in the fight. Ibn Batuta calls Kol "a fine town surrounded by mango groves". From these same groves the environs of Kol would appear to have acquired the name Sabzabad or "the green country".

In the reign of Akbar, Kol was made a Sirkar and included the dasturs of Marahra, Kol ba Haveli, Thana Farida and Akbarabad. Akbar and Jahangir visited Kol on hunting expeditions. Jahangir clearly mentions the forest of Kol, where he killed wolves.

During the time of Ibrahim Lodhi, Muhammad, son of Umar, was the governor of Kol. He built a fort at Kol and named the city Muhammadgarh, after himself, in 1524–25. Sabit Khan, who was then the governor of this region, rebuilt the old Lodhi fort and named the town Sabitgarh, after himself.

The ruler of Koil was Bargujar King Bahadur Singh who, in 1753, rose against the destruction of Hindu temples. The Jat ruler, Surajmal, with consent of Safdar Jang, occupied the fort of Koil. Bahadur Singh continued the battle from another fort and died fighting in what is known as the "Battle of Ghasera". It was renamed Ramgarh and Rao Durjan Singh Ponia of Bijauli was made the kiledar of the fort.  When a Persian Mughal Shia commander, Najaf Khan, captured Ramgarh, he renamed it and gave it its present name of Aligarh. Aligarh Fort (also called Aligarh Qila), as it stands today, was built by French engineers under the control of French officers Benoît de Boigne and Perron.

Battle of Aligarh (1803)

The Battle of Aligarh was fought on 1 September 1803 during the Second Anglo-Maratha War (1803–1805) at Aligarh Fort. The British 76th Regiment, now known as the Duke of Wellington's Regiment besieged the fort, which was under the control of the French officer Perron, and established British rule. In 1804, the Aligarh district was formed by the union of the second, third and fourth British divisions with the addition of Anupshahr from Muradabad and Sikandra Rao from Etawa. On 1 August 1804, Claude Russell was appointed the first Collector of the new district.

Administration
Aligarh district is divided into five tehsils, namely Kol Tehsil, Khair Tehsil, Atrauli, Gabhana and Iglas. These tehsils are further divided into 12 blocks.

The city is administered by Nagar Nigam Aligarh (Municipal Corporation), which is responsible for performing civic administrative functions administered by Mayor and Municipal Commissioner (PCS Officer). Infrastructure development of the city is looked after by the Aligarh Development Authority (ADA) administered by Divisional Commissioner (chairman) and vice-chairman (PCS Officer).

Aligarh is the headquarters of Aligarh Police Range and Aligarh Division. A DIG looks after Aligarh for legal condition and law; a Commissioner looks for four districts of Aligarh Division (Aligarh, Etah, Hathras, Kasganj).

Demographics

According to the 2011 Census, Aligarh has a total population of 874,408, of which 461,772 are males and 412,636 are females. Population in the age range 0–6 years is 119,543. The literacy rate is 59.15%, of which the male literacy rate is 63.42% and female literacy rate is 54.37%. The effective literacy rate of 7+ population of Aligarh was 68.5%, of which male literacy rate was 62.9% and the female literacy rate was 70.8%. The Scheduled Castes and Scheduled Tribes have a population of 138,184 and 332 respectively. There were 147363 households in Aligarh as of 2011. The city lies in the cultural region of Braj.

Geography

Location
Aligarh is located at the coordinates . It has an elevation of approximately 178 metres (587 feet). The city is in the middle portion of the doab, the land between the Ganges and the Yamuna rivers. The Grand Trunk Road passes through it via NH-91 is 134 km from capital of India.

Climate
Aligarh has a hot semi-arid climate (Köppen BSh) a little too dry to be a monsoon-influenced humid subtropical climate (Cwa). Summers start in April and are hot with temperatures peaking in May. The monsoon season starts in late June, continuing until early October, bringing high humidity. Aligarh gets most of its annual rainfall of  during these months. Temperatures then decrease, and winter sets in December, and continues until February. Winters in Aligarh are generally mild, but 2011–12 experienced the lowest temperature of 1 °C. The fog and cold snaps are extreme.

Economy

The city is an agricultural trade centre. Agricultural product processing and manufacturing are important.

Aligarh is an important business center of Uttar Pradesh and is most famous for its lock industry. Aligarh locks are exported across the world. In 1870, Johnson & Co. was the first English lock firm in Aligarh. In 1890, the company initiated production of locks on a small scale here.

Aligarh is famous for its brass hardware and sculpture. Today, the city holds thousands of manufacturers, exporters, and suppliers involved in the brass, bronze, iron and aluminum industries.

Indian Diecasting Industries which manufactures aluminum and zinc die-casting parts is located at Sasni Gate in Aligarh.

Harduaganj Thermal Power Station (also referred as Kasimpur Power House) is 15 km from the city. Narora Atomic Power Station is located 50 km from Aligarh.

Aligarh hosts Heinz-sauce manufacturing unit in Manzurgarhi, Satha sugar mill on the Aligarh-Kasimpur Power House route and a cement factory of UltraTech Cement company.

Wave Distillery, making Kingfisher beer, is located at Atrauli in Aligarh.

Education

Aligarh is a major educational hub, housing over 100 independent colleges and educational institutions. Notable tertiary institutions include:  

 ACN College of Engineering and Management Studies
 Aligarh College of Engineering and Technology
 Aligarh Muslim University
 Jamia Al Barkaat Aligarh

Art and craft 
Aligarh is associated with an appliqué and embroidery art known as phool patti ka kaam.

Locations

Cultural landmarks

Aligarh has several popular landmarks. Most notable few of them are Aligarh fort, Jama Masjid, Khereshwar Temple which is the birthplace of Swami Shri Haridas Ji, Dor fortress (1524), which is now in ruins, lies at the city's centre; its site is in the area now called Upper Fort (Balai Qila) and is occupied by an 18th-century mosque. The area Shah Jamal is very famous for a Sufi saint Syed Shah Jamal is also known as Shamsul Arifeen, of whom the tomb is located at Shahjamal area and surrounded by a graveyard. The Sufi Saint is mentioned by Ibn Battuta in his book The Travels of Ibn Battuta. The saint is said to be of Sufi Chishtiya order.

The Annual Cultural Exhibition, popularly known as Numaish, is held at the exhibition ground in January and February. The land Numaish Ground was donated by Nawab Rehmat Ullah Khan Sherwani. The cultural shows take place at three grand stages (Kohinoor, Krishnanjali and Muktakash). In all, more than 150 stage events featuring artists from across India take place during a period of 28–30 days.

Historical places

 Shekha Jheel, Bird Sanctuary
 Maulana Azad Library, AMU (Estd 1875)
 Sir Syed Masjid in Aligarh Muslim University's campus.

Aligarh Muslim University
Aligarh Muslim University (AMU) is one of the oldest central universities. It was established by Sir Syed Ahmed Khan as Madrasatul Uloom Musalmanan-e-Hind in 1875–78 which later became Mohammedan Anglo-Oriental College (MAO College). It was designed to train Muslims for government services in India and prepare them for advanced training in British universities. The Mohammedan Anglo-Oriental College became Aligarh Muslim University in 1920. It is famous for its Law, Medical, and Engineering College.

Museums
Ibn Sina Academy of Medieval Medicine and Sciences maintains 'Museum on History of Medicine and Sciences' and 'Museum on Arts, Culture and Orientalism'. It was established by a family Hakim Syed Zillur Rahman and Syed Ziaur Rahman at the heart of the city and near a busy market of Dodhpur.

Transport

By rail

Aligarh Junction railway station is the primary station for Aligarh city and is a major stop on the Delhi-Kolkata route. It is an A-Class railway station. It is one of the oldest railway station of this route. It connects Aligarh to the states of West Bengal, Odisha, Bihar, Jharkhand, north-east and most of Uttar Pradesh, and important stations of cities such as New Delhi railway station, Mumbai Central, Kolkata, Bhopal Junction railway station, Indore, Jammu, Gwalior, Lucknow, Jhansi, Puri, Kanpur Central railway station, Etawah Junction railway station, Tundla Junction railway station, Agra Cantonment railway station and Varanasi. Aligarh railway station handles over 136 trains daily (in both directions) and serves around 204,000 passengers every day. Aligarh has one Branch Railway Line to Bareily.

Aligarh City has following railway stations:
Aligarh Junction: an A-Class Railway Station
Somna (Gabhana) railway station
Mahrawal railway station
Kalua railway station
Daudkhan railway station
Mandrak railway station
Harduaganj railway station (Satha, near Kasimpur Power House)
Manjoorgarhi railway station (Chherat)

By road
Aligarh is 140 km from New Delhi. It is one of the Division of UPSRTC. Uttar Pradesh State Road Transport Corporation (UPSRTC) buses serve cities all over the state and cities in Uttarakhand, Rajasthan, Madhya Pradesh and Haryana.

Aligarh City has three UPSRTC bus stations:
Aligarh Depot(Old Bus Station/Gandhi Park Bus Station) bus station
Masoodabad(esta. 2000) (Budh Vihar Bus Station/New Bus Station/Workshop Bus Station/Raghuveerpuri Bus Station) Depot bus station(non-functional from 2018 to 2021)(now functioning since 2021 post renovation into a well facilitated Bus Station)
ISBT Rasualabad Sarsaul (New Bus Station/Sootmill Bus Station)(functioning since 2018 due to sudden non-functioning of Massodabaad Bus Station during 2018-2021 period)

There are buses plying from Aligarh to Delhi at frequent intervals via

1) Khair, Tappal, Palval, Faridabad, Delhi - The route is under construction between Khair and Palval and should be strictly avoided by cars. No toll charges.

2) Khair, Tappal, Yamuna expressway, Noida, Greater Noida, Delhi, Gurgaon - Best and recommended route for Delhi, Noida, Gurgaon. Toll Charges are ₹120 between Aligarh and Delhi.

3) Old GT Road, Bulandshahr, Ghaziabad, Delhi - NH 91 - It is a 4-lane highway. Toll charges are ₹190.

Following Highways are connected to Aligarh:
National Highway 91 - It connects Kolkata to national capital New Delhi. Ghaziabad-Bulandshahr-Aligarh section is a 4-Lane Highway.
National Highway 93 - It connects Moradabad to Taj Nagri Agra via Aligarh. Aligarh-Agra section is constructed as Brijbhoomi Expressway.
Yamuna Expressway - It is a 6-Lane Expressway connecting Greater Noida with Agra.

Aligarh City has Mahanagar Bus Service (City Bus Service) which provides local transport to Aligarh.
Route-1 J N Medical-Uperkot
Route-2 Gandhi Park-Sarsaul
Route-3 Ghantarbagh-Quarsi
Route-4 Gandhi Park-Boner
Route-5 Etah Chungi-Collectrate

Apart from this an Electronic Bus Service has been  running within the city since January 2022.

By air
The nearest international airport from Aligarh is Indira Gandhi International Airport, New Delhi. It is 140 km from Aligarh.

Aligarh Airport, in Dhanipur, is under construction on NH 91. Dhanipur Air Strip is used as Flying Club. The Government of Uttar Pradesh signed a memorandum of understanding with the Airports Authority of India in February 2014 for the development of the airport. The land acquisition for airport will be initiated soon and after its development flight operations will be started under regional connectivity scheme.

Notable people

Businessmen and entrepreneurs 
 
 
 Sheela Gautam, founder of Sheela Foam Limited-Sleepwell.
 Vijay Shekhar Sharma, founder of Paytm

Educationalists

 
 
 Ziauddin Ahmad, mathematician, M.L.A. (Central), Vice-Chancellor of Aligarh Muslim University Movement. He established several institution including J.N. Medical College
Roshan Ara Bokhari, dancer, choreographer and dance teacher
 Masud Husain Khan, linguist, the fifth Vice-Chancellor of Jamia Millia Islamia and the first Professor Emeritus in Social Sciences at Aligarh Muslim University
 Syed Ahmad Khan founder of Aligarh Muslim University

Writers, poets and publishers
 
 
 A.R. Akela, Dalit author and publisher, owner of "Anand Sahitya Sadan
 Syed Amin Ashraf, Urdu poet and professor of English at AMU
 Qurratulain Hyder, Padma Bhushan, Urdu novelist, writer, and journalist
 Akhlaq Mohammed Khan, pen name Shaharyar, Urdu poet, Bollywood lyricist and served as Professor at Aligarh Muslim University
 Munshi Nawal Kishore, book publisher
 Jainendra Kumar, Hindi writer
 Gopaldas Neeraj, poet, recipient of Padma Bhushan
 Saghar Nizami, Urdu Poet
 Prem Kishore Patakha, Hindi Humorous Poet
 Maitreyi Pushpa, Hindi fiction writer
 Rameshraj Tewarikar, Hindi Tewari poet, Editor:′ Tewari-Paksha (tri-monthly)

Historians

 
 
 Irfan Habib, eminent Indian historian and Professor Emeritus at Aligarh Muslim University
 Mohammad Habib (1895–1971), noted Indian historian and served as Professor Emeritus at Aligarh Muslim University

Film actors

 
 
 Shamim Ara, Pakistani film actress
 Bharat Bhushan, Bollywood actor, scriptwriter and producer
 Aadesh Chaudhary, Indian television actor
 Nitin Chauhaan, Indian television actor
 Ravindra Jain, Bollywood music director
 Alka Nupur, former actress, kathak dancer
 Chandrachur Singh, Bollywood actor
 Hasan Zaidi, Indian television actor
 Zarina, Indian artist

Sports persons
 
 
 Piyush Chawla, Indian cricketer
 Zafar Iqbal, Former hockey captain of India
 Annu Raj Singh, international shooter
 Rinku Singh, Cricketer

Politicians
 
 
 Zafar Alam ex-MLA from Aligarh (Assembly constituency)
 Dalbir Singh Chaudhary, MLA from Baruli vidhansabha constituency
Satish Kumar Gautam, current MP from, Aligarh (Lok Sabha constituency)
 Sheela Gautam,ex MP & owner of Sleepwell
Zameer Ullah Khan ex-MLA from Koil (Assembly constituency) and Aligarh (Assembly constituency)
 Jamal Khwaja, ex MP
 Sanjeev Raja, ex MLA
 Bijendra Singh, ex MP
 Chaudhary Sunil Singh, ex MLC
 Kalyan Singh, ex governor
 Rajendra Singh, ex Agriculture and Irrigation Minister, Govt of Uttar Pradesh
 Sandeep Singh, MLA Atrauli, grandson of Sh. Kalyan Singh
 Thakur Jaivir Singh, ex MLA (Now MLC)
 Roohi Zuberi, advocate

Medical professionals
 
 
 Khwaja Abdul Hamied, Pharmacist, founder of Cipla (pharmaceutical company)
 Prerna Kohli, clinical psychologist, social worker and author
 Hakim Syed Zillur Rahman, Unani physician and author
 Ashok Seth, an Indian interventional cardiologist

Social activists 
 
 
 Jai Kishan Das, a close associate of Sir Syed Ahmad Khan

See also
Jamia Millia Islamia

Notes

References

Further reading 
 Aligarh in My Days (Interviews of former Vice-Chancellors of Aligarh Muslim University), Ed. Syed Ziaur Rahman, Non-Resident Students' Centre, Aligarh Muslim University, Aligarh, 1997.
 

 
Articles containing potentially dated statements from 2001
All articles containing potentially dated statements
Cities and towns in Aligarh district
Cities in Uttar Pradesh